Stana Tomašević (1920–1983) was a Yugoslav Partisan officer during World War II, a model, and a Yugoslav politician and diplomat, serving as president (that is, speaker) of the Federal Chamber from 1979–82.

She was born in Montenegro and studied to become a teacher. She graduated not long before the Kingdom of Italy occupied Montenegro in 1941. As an idealistic young patriot, she immediately joined the Partisans and became the first woman commissar in Yugoslavia. She was wounded twice and ended the war highly decorated with the rank of colonel. In May 1944, the Germans attempted to capture Tito in the Bosnian town of Drvar; Stana's battalion played an important role in defending Tito. While she was in Drvar, the British military photographer John Talbot took inspiring pictures of her that were dropped as leaflets over Europe to encourage resistance to the occupiers. The photos became widely known to European resistance fighters. Her brother Duško was killed by chetniks while fighting in Bosnia. After the war she served as a federal minister in the Yugoslav government and was the country's first woman ambassador - to Norway and Iceland (1963-1967) and later Denmark (1974-1978). In Norway she met and married film-maker Eugen Arnesen, who died in 1969. She died of cancer in 1983, shortly after retiring as President of the Federal Chamber of the Yugoslav Parliament, the country's highest-ranking woman at that time.

See also
Kozarčanka

References

External links

1920 births
1983 deaths
Yugoslav Partisans members
Yugoslav women in politics
20th-century women politicians
Legislative speakers
Ambassadors of Yugoslavia to Denmark
Ambassadors of Yugoslavia to Norway
Propaganda in Yugoslavia
Women in the Yugoslav Partisans
Women ambassadors
Members of the Assembly of the Socialist Federal Republic of Yugoslavia
Yugoslav women diplomats
Women legislative speakers
Deaths from liver cancer